Kallisto may refer to:
 Kallisto (mythology), or Callisto, a nymph in Greek mythology
 204 Kallisto, an asteroid
 HS Kallisto, a Greek warship
 Kallisto, an RNA-Seq bioinformatics tool

See also 
 Kalisto (disambiguation)
 Callisto (disambiguation)
 Calisto (disambiguation)